The F.A.M.E. Tour was a concert tour by American recording artist Chris Brown to support his fourth studio album, F.A.M.E. (2011). The tour began in Australia during April 2011. Brown headlined 32 concerts in North America, which began in September 2011 and ended in November 2011.

Background 
On January 19, 2011, it was announced that Brown would embark on his "F.A.M.E. Tour" in Australia in April 2011. Presented by Jive Live, managing director Daniel Pritchard said, "Australia will be the first country in the world to be able to see the new Chris Brown show. His incredible stage performances have earned him a reputation as one of this generation's most electrifying male performers." Tickets for the shows were available on February 4 at Ticketek. The North American tour dates were announced on August 10, 2011. When speaking of the tour, Brown said, "this tour will allow me to paint a picture musically ... I want to bring a lot of energy and excitement to all the fans. It's going to be a great show."

Opening acts
Jessica Mauboy (Australia)
Justice Crew (Australia)
Havana Brown (Australia)
T-Pain (North America)
Kelly Rowland (Select dates in North America)
Tyga (North America)
Bow Wow (Select dates in North America)

Critical reception 
Briony Skinner from Brisbane Times wrote that Brown "certainly put on a memorable show", and added that he "delivered on the most spectacular aspect of his live performance and what many fans go to see – the dancing." Adriana Urquia from MTV Australia wrote that Brown's vocal ability was "impressive" during the performances of his "heartfelt ballads". She also added that, "Overall ... Brown had the crowd amped up and moving, jumping on cue, waving their arms and singing his tracks word for word."

Setlist
"Say It With Me"
"I Can Transform Ya"
"Wall to Wall"
"Run It!"
"Yo (Excuse Me Miss)"
"Body 2 Body"
"Wet the Bed"
"Take You Down"
"No Bullshit"
"She Ain't You" 
"Oh My Love"
"Deuces" 
"Look at Me Now" 
"With You" 
"All Back" 
"No Air"
"Yeah 3x" 
"Forever"
Encore
"Beautiful People"

Tour dates

Canceled dates

See also

List of Kelly Rowland live performances

References

2011 concert tours
Chris Brown concert tours